Theophil (see also Gottlieb)  may refer to:

Baron Theophil von Hansen (1813–1891), Danish architect who later became an Austrian citizen
Theophil Friedrich Christen (1879–1920), doctor, mathematician, physicist, economist and pioneer of physical medicine and X-ray radiation
Theophil Henry Hildebrandt (1888–1980), American mathematician
Theophil Mitchell Prudden (1849–1924), American pathologist
Theophil Ruderstaller (1906–1946), capuchin and China missionary
Theophil Wurm (1868–1953), a leader in the German Protestant Church

See also
Theophilus

Masculine given names
Theophoric names